Famara L. Jatta  (July 16, 1958 – March 17, 2012) was a Gambian government minister and economist. He was the Gambia's Secretary of State for Trade from 1997 to 1998, and Secretary of State for Finance and Economic Affairs from 1998 to 2003. From 2003 to 2007 he was Governor of the Central Bank of the Gambia.

References

External links

Interview, October 2000

1958 births
2012 deaths
Finance ministers of the Gambia
Government ministers of the Gambia
Governors of the Central Bank of The Gambia